Zaiga Jansone-Ivanova (born ) is a former Soviet Latvian tennis player and tennis coach. She was a five-time Soviet champion in women's doubles, 1973 Summer Universiade champion in women's doubles (all with Olga Morozova) and winner of the exhibition tennis event of 1968 Olympics in mixed doubles (with Vladimir Korotkov).

Biography 
Zaiga Jansone was born in Riga in 1951. Her father Jānis was her first tennis coach, and in the following years she has also been coached by Serguey Andreev and future Russian Tennis Hall-of-famer Semyon Belits-Geiman. She was representing clubs Daugava (Riga), CSKA (Moscow) and ASK (Riga).

Zaiga's best years in tennis encompassed the late 1960s and early 1970s. In 1968 she won a gold medal at the exhibition tennis event at Mexico Olympics where she partnered with Vladimir Korotkov in mixed doubles. In the final game they defeated the German-American team Peaches Bartkowicz-Ingo Buding. She also was awarded a bronze medal in women's doubles in the same event despite not winning a single tie: she and her Mexican partner Cecilia Rosado did not have to play a quarterfinals game and received bronze medals by default as semifinalists despite losing in semifinals to the eventual champions Rosa Maria Darmon and Julie Heldman.

Between 1969 and 1973 Zaiga Jansone, paired with Olga Morozova, won the Soviet tennis championships in women's doubles five times in a row. In 1970 she also met Morozova in the singles finals but lost 4–6, 3–6. Between 1969 and 1973 Morozova and Zaiga (who by 1973 was playing under family name Jansone-Ivanova) also won the European amateur championships four times and 1973 Summer Universiade in women's doubles.

Jansone's best results in open tennis tournaments where amateurs could play against world's best professionals came in 1971. That year she reached 4th round at the Wimbledon Championships in singles (eventually losing to the sixth-seed Nancy Richey) as well as her only finals at an open event: she and Morozova lost in the finals of Kent Championships to Christine Janes and Nell Truman. Her best result in mixed doubles came also at Wimbledon Championships two years earlier when she and Sergei Likhachev lost in fourth round to Koji Watanabe and Kazuko Sawamatsu.

Zaiga Jansone-Ivanova graduated in 1981 from the Latvian State University where she was studying journalism but her further career was in coaching. She first coached at the Jūrmala Sports School and in 1993 started her own Zaiga Jansone-Ivanova Tennis School in the same city.

WTA Finals

Doubles (0-1)

ITF Finals

Singles (0–2)

Doubles (11–1)

References

External sources 
 Profile at the Latvian Olympic Committee official website 
 
 Zaiga Jansone-Ivanova Tennis School at Latsports.lv

Soviet female tennis players
Latvian tennis coaches
Sportspeople from Riga
Tennis players at the 1968 Summer Olympics
Universiade medalists in tennis
1951 births
Living people
University of Latvia alumni
Universiade gold medalists for the Soviet Union
Medalists at the 1973 Summer Universiade